An estancia is a large, private plot of land used for farming or raising cattle or sheep. Estancias in the southern South American grasslands, the pampas, have historically been estates used to raise livestock, such as cattle or sheep. In Puerto Rico, an estancia was a farm growing ; that is, crops for local sale and consumption, the equivalent of a truck farm in the United States. In Argentina, they are large rural complexes with similarities to what in the United States is called a ranch.

History 
In the early Caribbean territories and Mexico, holders of encomiendas acquired land in the area where they had access to Indian labor. They needed on-site Hispanic supervisors or labor bosses called . In Mexico, multiple estancias owned by the same individual could be termed a hacienda. The term estancia is used in various ways in Argentina, Paraguay, Uruguay, southern Chile and southern Brazil. The equivalent in other Spanish American countries would be hacienda.

During the first centuries of Spanish colonial rule, the Spanish introduced cattle into the colonies for livestock. In the peripheral areas of northern Mexico and the southern part of South America, these animals roamed free; settlers conducted periodic raids to catch and slaughter them. In the 19th century stationary ranching ventures started to form in the pampas, with permanent buildings and marked livestock that clearly defined ownership. They were called estancias, the term indicating the stationary, permanent character.

The estancia's ranch worker on horseback in Argentina, the gaucho, has similar status in national folklore and identity to the cowboy of North America. Since the late 20th century, agriculture has intensified as an industry; landowners have often shifted from livestock to crop farming in the pampas of Argentina and Uruguay, due to the region's high soil fertility.

A small number of estancias in Argentina and Uruguay, as well as in Paraguay or Chile, particularly those with historic architecture, have been converted into guest ranches called paradores.

Several cities and villages, mainly but not exclusively in Latin America, developed from such estancias and are named accordingly, for example:
 Estância in Sergipe state, Brazil
 Estancia El Brete, Salta Province, Argentina
 Estancia, Iloilo in the province of Iloilo, Philippines.

California mission estancias
Many California missions in North America had separate farms and ranchos associated with them. These were known as California mission estancias, which were different from the California ranchos, based on land grants to individuals.

In Puerto Rico
An estancia, during Spanish colonial times in Puerto Rico (1508–1898), was a plot of land used for cultivating  (minor crops). That is, the crops in such farms were produced in relatively small quantities and thus were meant, not for wholesale or exporting, but for local, island-wide sale and consumption. Some such  were rice, corn, beans, batatas, ñames, yautías, and pumpkins; among fruits were plantains, bananas, oranges, avocados, and grapefruits.<ref>Eduardo Neumann Gandia. Verdadera y Autentica Historia de la Ciudad de Ponce: Desde sus primitivos tiempos hasta la época contemporánea. San Juan, Puerto Rico: Instituto de Cultural Puertorriqueña. 1913. Reprinted 1987. p. 67.</ref> A farm equipped with industrial machinery used for processing its crops into derivatives such as juices, marmalades, flours, etc., for wholesale and export was not called an estancia, but instead was called a hacienda''.  Most haciendas produced sugar, coffee and tobacco, which were the crops for export. Some estancias were larger than some haciendas, but generally this was the exception and not the norm.

See also

Finca Los Alamos estancia in Argentina
Station, in Australia

Notes

References

External links
Estancias of the Pampas, Argentina and Uruguay
Images of Modern Estancia Life In Uruguay 

Culture in Rio Grande do Sul
Ranches
Society of Uruguay
Social history of Argentina
Agriculture in Argentina
Sheep farming in Argentina
Sheep farming in Chile